John Joe Salvatore Martinez Marion (John) Mulligan is a Birmingham, England-born new wave musician. He is most prominently known as the bassist and keyboardist of the band Fashion from 1978-1984.

Biography

Salvatore Martinez Mulligan (AKA: Muligan) born The Sorrento, Moseley Birmingham.  United Kingdom. John Joe Salvatore Martinez Marion Mulligan [a Latin Catholic].

He is most prominently known as the dreadlocked founder member of the band Fashion (1) as the bassist and keyboardist with Dik Davis on vocals and drums and Luke Skyscraper (Alan James) on vocals and guitar.  They toured extensively with The Police, Squeeze, The Stranglers, The Ramones, B 52's, Patti Smith & The Gang Of 4.
			
Product Perfect (1979) on IRS Records.
Fashion [1] from 1978 – 1980.

Luke Skyscraper,  the original singer left after an American tour and was replaced by Tony Dial on vocals and guitar and released the “Alien Tapes” on Fashion Music. Produced by Bob Lamb (UB40)

Fashion [2] from 1980 – 1981.
 
De Harris and Marlon Recci joined to form the most successful version of the band. De on lead vocals and guitar, with Marlon on bass.

Releasing the singles: Move On, Streetplayer, Love Shadow with Gina X and White Stuff. All produced by Zeus B. Held from the top 10 album Fabrique.

De left the act after the release of Fabrique to pursue a career as a session musician and producer.

Fabrique (1982) on Arista
Fashion [3] from 1981 – 1982.

Troy Tate [Teardrop Explodes]replaced De on vocals and guitar.

Fashion [4] 1982

The final Fashion vocalist was Alan Darby

Twilight of Idols (1984) on De Stijl Records/CBS
Fashion [5] 1983 - 1985

All the way through the various line-ups of Fashion, Muligan had been involved with the bands’  production assisting Bob Lamb and Zeus B. Held. 
Muligan also had developed a reputation for the bands distinctive artwork and latterly video.

Muligan began to feature on other artists work like supplying the arpeggio sequences for Duran Durans’  “The Chauffeur”, plus live session work with Visage before branching out in the late 1980s and early 1990s to become a session musician and producer,  latterly as musical director with Bananarama and the Milli Vanilli Band.

One of Muligans’ earliest productions being Stephen (Tin Tin) Duffy's first hits “Kiss Me” and “Loves Duet”.  Both made  on 16 tracks at Bob Lamb studio in Kings Heath, Birmingham.

It was his sound design and programming that found him fame with Hollywood Beyond with” What's The Colour Of Money?” Soul II Soul, Reggae Philharmonic Orchestra and Kym Mazelle. Also programming remixes with Ben Chapman, for Alison Moyet and Adamski.

In the 1990s Muligan  worked with various management and record companies from storyboarding to filming and editing music videos for Instinctive Records, Dub TV and Freetown Records.

He now writes and performs music with ‘The League Of Hedonists’ and ‘Star Chamber Orchestra’. Has retired to paint large realist oil painting and designs 1930s inspired clothing for ‘Commonwealth Classics’ with his wife Lucy Muligan-Lei.

Equipment
Synthesizers used in Fashion from 1981 onward

Roland Jupiter-8- Primary keyboard
Moog Source
PPG Wave
Oberheim-OB-Xa

Discography of Fashion 

Product Perfect (1979)
Fabrique (1982)
Twilight of Idols (1984)

References

English new wave musicians
Living people
Year of birth missing (living people)
Alumni of Birmingham Institute of Art and Design